Croxall is a surname. Notable people with the surname include:

 John Croxall (born 1946), British biologist.
 Kyle Croxall (born 1988), Canadian ice hockey player and skater.
 Martine Croxall (born 1969), British journalist and television news presenter.
 Samuel Croxall (1690-1752), Anglican churchman, writer and translator.
 Thomas Henry Croxall (fl. 1948–1967), English minister and translator.

See also

Croxall, Staffordshire, United Kingdom